Huwyl is a hamlet of Römerswil in the district Hochdorf in the canton Lucerne in Switzerland. The hamlet is incorporated into the Municipality of Römerswil.

The hamlet name changed from Hueneweilare (1101) and Hunenweilare (1241) to Huwil.   From 1230 to 1474, this town seated to the Lords of Hunwil. They lived in Huwyl Burg.

References

 Municipalities of the canton of Lucerne